Bugskull & The Big White Cloud is the sixth studio album by Bugskull, released in 2000 by Scratch Records.

Track listing

Personnel 
Adapted from the Bugskull & The Big White Cloud liner notes.
Sean Byrne – lead vocals, instruments
James Yu – instruments

Release history

References

External links 
 
 Bugskull & The Big White Cloud at Bandcamp

2000 albums
Bugskull albums